Goa Football Association ( GFA) is the state governing body of football in Goa within the jurisdiction of the Republic of India. It is affiliated with the All India Football Federation, the national governing body.                    

Caitano Fernandes heads GFA as its current President. The GFA's premier competition is the Goa Professional League.

History
The Goa Football Association was founded in 1959. The federation conducted its first Goan State League in 1959 also under the name of Goa First Division with Clube Independente de Margao becoming the champions. The GFA then started the Goa Senior League in 1969, which was supposed to be the new first division of Goa, but later disbanded the league. Then for the 1970-71 season they turned the league into a two division First Division, North Division and South Division. They then introduced the a Second Division and Third Division from 1971-72.

The GFA then started the Goa Super Division in 1977 with Salgaocar S.C. being the champions. With football, globally, continuing to develop at a fast pace, the Goa Football Association, decided it was time to push the game onto a higher platform. Goa emerged as the first State ever in India to go professional.
Yt
The GFA then revamped the National State League by forming the Goa Professional League in 1997 with Salgaocar coming out as champions. The Professional League was expanded to six teams from the 2000-01 season, after the GFA thought it wise to increase the number and increase the competitiveness factor, and since 2002 the league was played as an eight team league with home-and-away fixtures making it 14 matches for each club. The GFA then announced that the 2011 season would be played with 10 teams under a new format.

Goan football pyramid
The Goan football pyramid consists of the Goa Professional League as highest level, followed by the lower divisions.

References

External links

Goa Football Association at the AIFF

Football governing bodies in India
 
1959 establishments in Portuguese India
Sports organizations established in 1959
Organisations based in Panaji